Jahan-e-Khusrau (Urdu, Persian: جہاں خسرو, Hindi: जहान-ए-खुसरो) is an annual three-day sufi music festival held in New Delhi, India to commemorate the death anniversary of the saint Amir Khusrau.

History
Jahan-e-Khusrau was started in the year 2001 by noted film director and artist, Muzaffar Ali.

The festival
The festival is held at Arab ki Sarai, Humayun's Tomb Monuments, Delhi — incidentally, this is where Khusrau started the qawwali music tradition in the 13th century AD.

Performers

Year - 2001
Dates - 10–11 March
Venue - Arab ki Sarai, Humayun Tomb Monuments, New Delhi
 Artists -
 * Rumi Group, IRAN
 * Lotfi Bouchnak, TUNISIA
 * Abida Parveen, PAKISTAN

Year - 2002
Dates - 8 - 9–10 March
Venue - Arab ki Sarai, Humayun Tomb Monuments, New Delhi
 Artists -
 * Kabir Helminski, USA
 * Drummers from, SUDAN
 * Mahasa Vahdat and the Rumi Group, IRAN

 * Sultana Chaudhuri, BANGLADESH
 * Whirling Dervishes, TURKEY
 * Abida Parveen, PAKISTAN
 * Shubha Mudgal, DELHI

 * Ghulam Nabi Namtahali, KASHMIR
 * Manjari, LUCKNOW
 * Samandar Khan, RAJASTHAN
 * Noorul Hasan, LUCKNOW

Year - 2003
Dates - 28 February, 1–2 March
Venue - Arab ki Sarai, Humayun Tomb Monuments, New Delhi
 Artists -
 * Masood Habibi & group, IRAN
 * Whirling Dervishes, TURKEY
 * Hassan Hakmoun, MOROCCO
 * Farida Parveen BANGLADESH

 * Abida Parveen, PAKISTAN
 * Zila Khan, DELHI
 * Sidi Sufis, GUJARAT
 * Ghulam Nabi Namtahali, KASHMIR
 * Qutubi Qawwal, DELHI
 
 * Nazeer Khan Warsi, HYDERABAD
 * Ghulam Fareed Nizami, DELHI
 * Asrar Husain, AJMER
 * Muhammad Ahmad Khan Warsi, RAMPUR
 * Noorul Hasan, LUCKNOW

Year - 2004
Dates - 26–27 March
Venue - Arab ki Sarai, Humayun Tomb Monuments, New Delhi
 Artists -
 * Masood Habibi, IRAN
 * Shye BenTzur, ISRAEL
 * Abida Parveen, PAKISTAN

 * Ila Arun, MUMBAI
 * Astad Deboo, MUMBAI
 * Shubha Mudgal, DELHI

Year - 2005
Dates - 4 - 5–6 March
Venue - Arab ki Sarai, Humayun Tomb Monuments, New Delhi
 Artists -
 * Mehmet Kemiksiz, TURKEY
 * Abida Parveen, PAKISTAN
 * Shafqat Ali Khan, PAKISTAN
 
 * Shye BenTzur, ISRAEL
 * Azam Ali, USA
 * Masood Habibi, IRAN

 * Zila Khan, DELHI
 * Vidya Rao, DELHI
 * Shujaat Husain Khan, DELHI
 * Dadi Pudumji, DELHI

Year - 2006
Dates - 4 - 5–6 March
Venue - Arab ki Sarai, Humayun Tomb Monuments, New Delhi

Year - 2007
Dates - 30–31 March & 1 April
Venue - Quli Khan's Tomb, Mehrauli Archeological Park, New Delhi
 Artists -
 * Wendy Jehlan, USA
 * Sussan Deyhim, USA
 * Abida Parveen, PAKISTAN

 * Malini Awasthi, LUCKNOW
 * Shauqat Ali & Group, LUDHIANA
 * Jaaved Jaaferi, MUMBAI

 * Rekha Bhardwaj, MUMBAI
 * Meeta Pandit, DELHI
 * Nizami Brothers, DELHI

Year - 2008 Jahan e Khusrau was not held

Year - 2009
Date - 19 October 
Venue - SKICC, Shrinagar, Kashmir

Year - 2010
Dates - 26 - 27 - 28 Feb
Venue - Arab ki Sarai, Humayun Tomb Monuments, New Delhi
 Artists -
 * Tamboura Troupe, EGYPT
 * Omar Faruk Ttekbelik, USA
 * Masaka Ono, JAPAN

 * Sanam Marvi, PAKISTAN
 * Abida Parveen, PAKISTAN
 * Malini Awasthi, LUCKNOW

 * Samandar Khan, RAJASTHAN
 * Rabbi Shergill, PUNJAB
 * Astad Deboo, MUMBAI
 * Radhika Chopra, DELHI

Year - 2011
Dates - 15–16 & 17 April
Venue - Southbank Centre, London

Year - 2011
Dates - 11–13 March
Venue - Arab ki Sarai, Humayun Tomb Monuments, New Delhi
 Artists -
 * Azalea Ray, CANADA
 * Dalahoo Ensemble, IRAN
 * Shafqat Ali Khan, PAKISTAN
 
 * Sami Brothers, PAKISTAN
 * Manjari, LUCKNOW
 * Wajahat Husain Badayuni, UTTAR PRADESH

 * Ustad Shujaat Husain Khan, DELHI
 * Hans raj Hans, PUNJAB
 * Malini Awasthi, LUCKNOW
 * Chand Nizami, DELHI

Year - 2012
Dates - 2 - 3–4 March
Venue - Arab ki Sarai, Humayun Tomb Monuments, New Delhi
 Artists -
 * Andrea Grmmelli, ITALY
 * Ali Zafar, PAKISTAN
 * Shafqat Ali Khan, PAKISTAN
 
 * Abida Parveen, PAKISTAN
 * Zia Nath, MUMBAI
 * Indira Naik, MUMBAI
 * Murad Ali, LUCKNOW

 * Vidhi Sharma, DELHI
 * Rajesh Pandey, DELHI
 * Shivani Varma, DELHI
 * Hans raj Hans, PUNJAB

Year - 2012
Dates - 21–22 October
Venue - Central Park, Jaipur

Year - 2013
Dates - 1- 2–3 March
Venue - Arab ki Sarai, Humayun Tomb Monuments, New Delhi
 Artists -
 * Mercan Dede, CANADA
 * Shafqat Ali Khan, PAKISTAN
 * Abida Parveen, PAKISTAN
 * Sonam Kalra, DELHI
 * Malini Awasthi, LUCKNOW
 * Astha Dikshit, DELHI
 * Deveshi Sehgal, DELHI

Year - 2013
Dates - 5–6 October
Venue - Central Park, Jaipur

Year - 2017
Dates - 24 - 25–26 March
Venue - Arab ki Sarai, Humayun Tomb Monuments, New Delhi
 Artists -
 * Hans raj Hans, PUNJAB
 * Sonam Kalra, DELHI
 * Malini Awasthi, LUCKNOW

 * Ustad Iqbal Ahmad Khan, DELHI
 * Deveshi Sehgal, DELHI

 * Syed Sahil Agha, DELHI
 * Daler Mehndi, PUNJAB

Year - 2018
Dates - 9 - 10–11 March
Venue - Arab ki Sarai, Humayun Tomb Monuments, New Delhi
 Artists -
 YAMUNA - Dariya Prem Ka : Part 1
 A dance ballet directed by Muzaffar Ali, 
 *Barnali Chatopadhyya, *Archana Shah, *Astha Dixit & Group. 
 * Aalamato Group, Iran
 * Malini Awasthi, Lucknow
 * Kanwar Grewal, Punjab

 * World Ethnic Music Ensemble with Murad Ali
 * Pooja Ghaitonde, Mumbai
 * Barnal Chatopadhyya, Kolkata
 * Kailash Kher's Kailasa, Mumbai

 YAMUNA - Dariya Prem Ka : Part 2
 * Shuba Mudgal, Delhi
 * Syed Sahil Agha, Delhi
 * Hans Raj Hans, Punjab

Year - 2019
Dates - 8 - 9–10 March
Venue - Arab ki Sarai, Humayun Tomb Monuments, New Delhi
 Artists -
 * Minu Bakshi, Delhi
 * Ganganama - The Circle of Life
   Sanjukta Sinha & Kadamb Ensemble
 * Satinder Sartaj, Punjab

 * Roohani Sisters, Delhi
 * Kanwar Grewal, Punjab

 * Shahid Niyati & Sami Niyati, Rampur
 * Syed Sahil Agha, Delhi
 * Javed Ali, Mumbai

See also

List of Hindustani classical music festivals

References

External links
 Official site
 Jahan-e-Khusrau website 

Music festivals established in 2001
Hindustani classical music festivals
Festivals in Delhi
2001 establishments in Delhi
Islamic music festivals